Kalamaja (Estonian for Fish House) is a subdistrict of the district of Põhja-Tallinn (Northern Tallinn) in Tallinn, the capital of Estonia. It is located just northwest of the historical town centre, on the coast of the Tallinn Bay. Kalamaja has a population of 9,820.

Kalamaja is one of the best preserved wooden architecture areas in Tallinn and Estonia. The quiet neighbourhood has long been known for its colourful hodgepodge of old fashioned, working class houses.

Throughout most of Tallinn's history Kalamaja served as the city's main fishing harbour. Starting from the 14th century the area was traditionally dominated by fishermen, fishmongers and boat wrights. A new era began in 1870, when Tallinn was connected to Saint Petersburg by railroad. The Tallinn railway station (Balti jaam), was built between Kalamaja and the city centre. Suddenly enormous factories started to sprout up in this part of town, and they brought with them an influx of thousands of new workers. The wooden houses, which have become Kalamaja's architectural legacy, were built to accommodate these workers.

Most of the Kalamaja's main sightseeings are located on the coast of Kalamaja. In 2011 a former railway embankment was converted into a walking trail called "Culture Kilometre" (Kultuurikilomeeter). The walk-way starts next to the Tallinn harbour passes the Creative Hub (Kultuurikatel), continues past the historic Patarei Prison and Sea Fortress, the region's biggest sea centre Seaplane Harbour (Lennusadam) and ends at the end of Kalamaja park on Tööstuse street. In 2015, the former Kultuurikilomeeter was converted into a street, which quickly became one of the defining streets of the neighbourhood.

Kalamaja cemetery
Kalamaja was the location of the oldest cemetery in Tallinn, known as Kalamaja cemetery which was founded in the 15th or 16th century. The cemetery was flattened in 1964, during the second occupation of the Baltic states, by Soviet authorities who used the area of Kalamaja as a base for the Soviet Armed Forces.

Gallery

See also
Kalamaja cemetery
Patarei Prison
Linnahall
Tallinn Power Plant (Kultuurikatel)
Estonia Piano Factory

External links
Kalamaja Information Page
Image of a late 19th or early 20th century map showing the district of Kalamaja and the area of the cemetery
Discovering Tallinn Fish Market
Kalamaja blog 
Patarei Prison - Culture Park

References

Subdistricts of Tallinn